What Am I Doing Here may refer to:
 "What Am I Doing Here" (song), written and recorded by Canadian country rock group Blue Rodeo, released in June 1991
 What Am I Doing Here (book) (1988), a book by British Author Bruce Chatwin, containing a collection of essays, profiles and travel stories from his life